Mother's Meat and Freud's Flesh is a Canadian comedy-drama cult film, released in 1984. The directorial debut of underground filmmaker Demetrios Estdelacropolis, it was made while he was a film student at Concordia University.

Plot
Inspired by the early trash films of John Waters, the film stars Estdelacropolis as Demira, a gay porn actor struggling with both his emotionally complicated relationship with his mother Esther (Esther Vargas) and his desire to break out of porn and into mainstream movies. He connects with a Freudian psychiatrist who is convinced that his homosexuality stems from an unresolved Oedipus complex which he has repressed by denying his natural attractions to women, to which the psychiatrist's proposed solution is to hypnotize Esther into believing that she is a man so that men will become the gender that sexually repulses Demira; in his career, he is ambivalent when the first "mainstream" role he is able to land is a gore film in which he will play the victim of a cannibal family for which Esther has also been cast as the mother.

Cast
 George Agettees as Flaky Porno Director
 Pierre Bastien as Gay Basher
 Christian Dufault as N.Y. boy friend
 Demetri Estdelacropolis (credited as Demetri Demetrios) as Dimira / Lucie 
 Michel Gagnon as Psycho / Dentist
 Lawrence Joseph as Hollywood Movie Producer
 Harry Karagopian as Harry
 W.A. MacGregor as Couch Prop
 Marjorie Morton as Woman with Pliers
 Claire Nadon as Porno actress
 E.J. Sullivan as Speed
 Michelle Tardif as Gore Twin Girl
 Rick Trembles as Gore Twin Boy
 Esther Vargas as Esther

Production
Estdelacropolis wrote the film as a star vehicle for Vargas, with the goal of turning her into the new Edith Massey. He had first met Vargas in the lobby of a YWCA in Montreal, and was so taken with her eccentric personality that he later recorded 48 hours of her stream of consciousness monologues on random topics.

The film's production was officially credited to the National Film Board and the Canada Council, although both organizations denied actual involvement. Estdelacropolis had used NFB resources on his own time to complete the film while interning with the organization on another unrelated project, and the Canada Council was credited because the film was funded partly by the unspent portion of a grant he had previously received from the organization for a never-completed documentary film on the education of deaf students.

The film's soundtrack was composed by the German new wave synthpop band Trio.

Release

The film debuted at the 1984 Berlin International Film Festival and subsequently screened at other film festivals, but faced difficulty in obtaining general market release due to its graphic content.

For the 1984 Festival of Festivals, it was given a one-time clearance by the Ontario Board of Censors, with the note that it would have to be resubmitted for another review if it received any further theatrical releases in the province.

Reception
The film received mixed reviews from critics. Jay Scott wrote in The Globe and Mail that parts of the film were "hilarious" while other parts betrayed a "mindnumbing repetitiveness", while Variety savaged it as "offensive to virtually every minority and majority group in society." Writing for Cinema Canada, conversely, Gary Evans wrote that "The Freudian angle about mother-son relationships and homosexuality is such a parody of contemporary wisdoms that only the most hypersensitive (or Estdelacropolis' real mother) would feel threatened."

The film was screened at the 1985 Sundance Film Festival, where one audience member so disliked the film that he personally presented Estdelacropolis with a llama fetus as a "prize". In later interviews for the promotion of his 1999 film Shirley Pimple, Estdelacropolis claimed that Joel Coen had offered to give his Best Picture award for Blood Simple to Estdelacropolis in exchange for the fetus.

References

External links 
 

1984 films
1984 comedy-drama films
1984 LGBT-related films
Canadian comedy-drama films
Canadian LGBT-related films
English-language Canadian films
Films about actors
Films about gay male pornography
Films about pornography
LGBT-related comedy-drama films
1984 directorial debut films
1980s English-language films
1980s Canadian films